Kakkathamburatti is a 1970 Indian Malayalam film directed by P. Bhaskaran and produced by C. J. Baby and P. C. Ittoop. The film stars Prem Nazir, Madhu, Sharada, and Jayabharathi. The film has a musical score by K. Raghavan.

Cast
 
Prem Nazir as Naanu
Madhu as Rajappan
Sharada as Janamma
Jayabharathi as Sarala
Adoor Bhasi as Kuttappan
P. J. Antony as Kochupaappu
Sankaradi as Kittuashan
Sreelatha Namboothiri  as Devayani
Paul Vengola as Manth Padmanabhan
Aravindakshan as Shankaran
Latheef as Velu
Adoor Bhavani as Kushinikaali
Bhaskaran Nair as Politician
G. K. Pillai as Kaduva Vasu
Khadeeja as Naani
Kottarakkara Sreedharan Nair as Kunju Panikkan
Kuttan Pillai as Vaidyar
Pathrose Kunnamkulam
Veeran
Vijayan Pallikkara
Padmakumar

Soundtrack
The music was composed by K. Raghavan and the lyrics were written by Sreekumaran Thampi and P. Bhaskaran.

References

External links
 

1970 films
1970s Malayalam-language films
Films directed by P. Bhaskaran